The 2008 England rugby union tour of New Zealand was a series of matches played in June 2008 in New Zealand by England national rugby union team.

Results

England
tour
England national rugby union team tours of New Zealand
tour